Livingston County Courthouse may refer to:
Livingston County Courthouse (Pontiac, Illinois), built in 1874 and listed on the National Register of Historic Places (NRHP)
Livingston County Courthouse (Kentucky)
Old Livingston County Courthouse (Kentucky), on the National Register of Historic Places listings in Livingston County, Kentucky
Livingston County Courthouse (Geneseo, New York), an 1898-designed courthouse
Livingston County Courthouse (Michigan), a listing on National Register of Historic Places in Livingston County, Michigan